Norwood Park Township is one of 29 townships in Cook County, Illinois, USA.  As of the 2010 census, its population was 26,385.

Geography
Its ZIP Code is 60631.

Cities, towns, villages
 Harwood Heights
 Norridge (vast majority)
 Park Ridge (southeast edge)

Unincorporated areas
 a residential area surrounded by Norwood Park, Chicago
 the Ridgemoor Country Club adjacent to Harwood Heights
 the Westlawn Cemetery and Mausoleum adjacent to Norridge

Adjacent townships
 Leyden Township (southwest)
 Maine Township (northwest)

Cemeteries
The township contains these two cemeteries: Acacia Park and Westlawn Jewish.

Major highways
  Interstate 90
  Illinois Route 171
  Illinois Route 19
  Illinois Route 43

History
After World War II a housing complex called Thatcher Homes was built to accommodate war veterans and their families. The complex was demolished around 1955. Serial killer John Wayne Gacy lived in the township, killing his 33 victims at his home and burying most of the bodies in its crawlspace.

Demographics

Political districts
 Illinois's 5th congressional district
 Illinois's 9th congressional district
 State House District 19
 State House District 20
 State Senate District 10

References
 
 United States Census Bureau 2007 TIGER/Line Shapefiles
 United States National Atlas

External links

 City-Data.com
 Illinois State Archives
 Township Officials of Illinois

Townships in Cook County, Illinois
Townships in Illinois